Harborside is an unincorporated village in the town of Brooksville, Hancock County, Maine, United States. Harborside had a post office from April 7, 1898, until December 20, 2003; it still has its own ZIP code, 04642.

References

Villages in Hancock County, Maine
Villages in Maine